Jeremy Yasasa (born 27 March 1985)  is a Papua New Guinean footballer who plays as a defender for Hekari United in the Papua New Guinea National Soccer League and the Papua New Guinea national team.

References 

Living people
1985 births
Papua New Guinean footballers
Papua New Guinea international footballers
Hekari United players
Association football defenders
2012 OFC Nations Cup players
2016 OFC Nations Cup players